Krum Kill is a stream in the U.S. state of New York.

"Krum" most likely is derived from Dutch meaning "crooked".

References

Rivers of Albany County, New York
Rivers of New York (state)